Terøya (or Terøy) is a small, populated island in Ålesund Municipality in Møre og Romsdal county, Norway. The population of Terøya (about 200-300 people) is concentrated on the southern and eastern parts of the island. Terøya is connected to the village of Søvik on the mainland by a causeway on the east side. The island of Bjørnøya lies to the west of the island.

Terøya was part of the municipality of Borgund until 1965 and then it was part of Haram Municipality until 2020 when it joined Ålesund.

References

Ålesund
Islands of Møre og Romsdal